The F-liiga is the top men’s floorball league in Finland. The league was founded as Salibandyn SM-sarja (English: Floorball Finnish Champions-Series) in 1986 by the Finnish Floorball Federation (SSBL). It was renamed to Salibandyliiga for the 1994–95 season. The Salibandyliiga was operated by the company SSBL Salibandy Oy, a subsidiary of the Finnish Floorball Federation. The current name F-liiga is used since season 2020–21.

The champion of the league is eligible to compete at the Champions Cup.

Format

Regular season

The regular season is played in a round robin format with each team playing 26 games. The total number of regular season games is 182. The eight teams that finish the regular season at the top of the standings qualify for the playoffs in the spring.

Playoffs

The top eight teams from the regular season play for the Finnish Championship. The first placed team from the regular season picks their opponent from the teams that placed fifth through eighth. The second placed team picks their opponent from the remaining three and after that the third placed team makes its pick of the two remaining teams. The last playoff pair is made of two remaining team. The playoffs are played in best-of-seven format.

Playout

The playout round was first introduced for 2014–15 season. The teams placed that placed eleventh through fourteenth continue to a playout phase after the regular season. The eleventh placed team picks their opponent, either the thirteenth or fourteenth placed team. The winners of the first round of playout get to keep their spots in Salibandyliiga, but the losing teams face each other in the second round. The winner of the second round of playout faces the second placed team of Divari (English: First Division). The winner of this match-up wins a place in the Salibandyliiga and losing team is relegated. The loser of the second round of playout is also relegated to Divari. The winner of Divari is directly promoted to Salibandyliiga.

Current teams

Teams in 2022–23 season:
 Classic, Tampere
 EräViikingit, Helsinki
 FBC Turku, Turku
 Happee, Jyväskylä
 Indians, Espoo
 Jymy, Seinäjoki
 LASB, Lahti
 Nokian KrP, Nokia	
 Oilers, Espoo
 OLS, Oulu	
 SPV, Seinäjoki
 TPS, Turku

Recent champions

List of champions

All records updated as of season 2021–22.

Records

Regular season

Game records

 Highest attendance : 3214
 Oilers vs. TPS (4–1), 12-09-2014
 Biggest home win: 21–6
 Gunners vs. OLS (21–6), 10-22-2006
 Biggest away win: 1–17
 Pirkat vs. SSV (1–17), 03-03-2007
 HIFK vs. SSV (1–17), 12-12-2007
 Highest scoring game: 34
 Classic vs. OLS (18–12), 09-29-2009

Individual records

Career

 Most games played: 450
  Mikael Järvi
Most goals: 415
 Mikko Kohonen
 Most assists: 327
  Mikael Järvi
 Most points: 667
  Mikael Järvi

Season

Most goals: 63
  Tero Tiitu (Oilers), 2006–07
Most assists: 68
  Mika Kohonen (Happee), 2004–05
 Most points: 108
  Jaakko Hintikka, (Oilers), 2005–06

Playoffs

Game records

 Highest attendance : 5580
 Josba vs. Oilers (4–7), 07-04-2002
 Biggest win: 14–2
 SSV vs. Classic (14–2), 04-03-2008
 Highest scoring game: 24
 SSV vs. OLS (17–7), 10-03-2006

Individual records

Career

 Most games played: 169
  Mikael Järvi
Most goals: 138
 Mikael Järvi
 Most assists: 116
  Mikael Järvi
 Most points: 254
  Mikael Järvi

Season

Most goals: 20
  Santtu Manner (SSV), 2004–05
Most assists: 21
  Mika Kohonen (Happee), 2004–05
 Most points: 32
  Mika Kohonen (Happee), 2004–05

All records updated as of season 2013–14.

External links
 Official website 
 fliiga.com – F-liiga 
 Finnish Floorball Federation

References

Floorball competitions in Finland
Sports leagues in Finland
1986 establishments in Finland
Sports leagues established in 1986